Robert Kościelniakowski (born 3 May 1964) is a Polish fencer. He competed in the individual and team sabre events at the 1988 and 1992 Summer Olympics.

References

External links
 

1964 births
Living people
Polish male fencers
Olympic fencers of Poland
Fencers at the 1988 Summer Olympics
Fencers at the 1992 Summer Olympics
Fencers from Warsaw
21st-century Polish people
20th-century Polish people